The 2008 season of Meistriliiga, the first level in the Estonian football system, was the 18th season in the league's history. It began on 8 March 2008 and ended on 15 November 2008. The defending champions were Levadia.

Promotion and relegation
10th placed Ajax were directly relegated after the end of the previous season. Since reserve squads are not allowed to be promoted to Meistriliiga, third placed Esiliiga team Sillamäe Kalev were directly promoted to 2008 Meistriliiga.

Kuressaare (9th placed Meistriliiga team) and Kalju (6th placed Esiliiga team) competed in promotion/relegation play-offs for one spot in 2008 Meistriliiga. The aggregate score was 2–2 and Nõmme Kalju were promoted due to scoring more away goals.

Clubs and venues

League table

Relegation play-off
Vaprus and Esiliiga side Paide Linnameeskond competed in a two-legged relegation play-off for one spot in 2009 Meistriliiga. Aggregate score was 5–5 and Paide Linnameeskond secured their place in 2009 Meistriliiga because they scored more away goals (3–1).

Results
Each team played every opponent four times, twice at home and twice on the road, for a total of 36 games.

First half of season

Second half of season

Season statistics

Top scorers

Awards

Monthly awards

See also
 2008 Esiliiga

References

External links
 soccernet.ee 
 soccerassociation.com

 

Meistriliiga seasons
1
Estonia
Estonia